Club Deportivo Ilunion, formerly known as Club Deportivo Fundosa ONCE, is a wheelchair basketball team based in Madrid, Spain.

History
Fundosa ONCE was founded in 1994 as the sports club of the ONCE. Since its first season, the club played in División de Honor thanks to achieving the league berth of CD ONCE Andalucía.

Fundosa ONCE is the most prolific team in the Spanish wheelchair basketball. In 1997, the club won the IWBF Champions Cup, its biggest achievement until repeating the feat in 2015 and 2016 respectively.

In 2014, Fundosa ONCE changed its name to CD Ilunion. Two years later, Ilunion won its second IWBF Champions Cup after beating in the final RSV Lahn-Dill by 71–45.

Season by season

Notable players
 Alejandro Zarzuela
 Terry Bywater

References

External links
 Official website
 History of Fundosa ONCE

Sports teams in Madrid
Wheelchair basketball teams in Spain
Basketball teams in the Community of Madrid